Cesare Bazzani (1873 - 1939) was a prominent and prolific Italian architect and engineer.  Active from 1911 until his death in 1939, Bazzani designed major municipal works in several cities.

Works  
 Biblioteca Nazionale Centrale (National Library of Italy), Florence, with V. Mazzei (1873-1939)
 Cassa di Risparmio, Ascoli Piceno (1905-1915)
 altar of the Chapel of the Madonna della Purità, Sant'Andrea della Valle, Rome (1912)
 Galleria Nazionale d'Arte Moderna, Rome, with exterior architectural friezes by sculptors Ermenegildo Luppi, Adolfo Laurenti, and Giovanni Prini (1911-1915) 
 Palazzo del Governo, Terni (1920)
 Paradiso sul mare, a seaside casino, Anzio (1922)
 facade restoration and other work, Papal Basilica of Saint Mary of the Angels in Assisi (1924-1930)
 renovations to the Palazzo Trinci, Foligno (1927)
 Chiesa del Carmine (Messina) (1931)
 Gran Madre di Dio, Rome (1931-1933)
 Pescara Cathedral (1939)

References 

1873 births
1939 deaths
19th-century Italian architects
20th-century Italian architects